Conor MacNeill (born 4 July 1988) is a film, television, and stage actor from Northern Ireland.

Biography
MacNeill was born in West Belfast and has appeared in such films as Fifty Dead Men Walking and Peacefire directed by Macdara Vallely. He made a cameo appearance as 'Fanta' in Cherrybomb. He played the character of Dave in Five Minutes of Heaven. The film was directed by Oliver Hirschbiegel and was premiered at the 2009 Sundance Film Festival.

He starred alongside Risteárd Cooper as Ciaran MacIonraic in Irish comedy drama An Crisís, for which he received a Nomination for Outstanding Actor in a Comedy drama series at the 2010 Festival de Télévision de Monte-Carlo. He performed extensively on stage in Ireland. Acting in productions at Lyric Players' Theatre, Gate Theatre and Project Arts Centre. He was nominated for Best Supporting Actor at the 2011 Irish Times Theatre Awards.

In 2011, he appeared, with Brendan Fraser, David O'Hara and Martin McCann, in Whole Lotta Sole directed by Terry George. The film premiered at the 2012 Tribeca Film Festival. He appeared alongside David Wilmot in RTÉ's Saving The Titanic playing Frank Bell.

In 2013 he appeared as a series regular Pvt. McIlvenny in Privates on BBC One and reprised his role as Ciaran MacIonraic in Crisis Eile for TG4.

MacNeill made his London stage debut in 2012 at the Donmar Warehouse and appeared on stage alongside Daniel Radcliffe in The Cripple of Inishmaan by Martin McDonagh, directed by Michael Grandage at the Noël Coward Theatre in London's West End throughout the summer of 2013. In Spring 2014 this production transferred to Broadway at the Cort Theatre for a limited run. The show garnered 6 TONY Award nominations.

In 2016 MacNeill appeared in Whit Stillman's film Love & Friendship and in the final episodes of the RTE/BBC series The Fall. In 2017 he appeared in series 2 of No Offence on Channel 4. He was due to reprise the role of Gavin in series 3 during 2018.

In April 2017, he appeared in The Ferryman at the Royal Court Theatre, ahead of a transfer to the Gielgud Theatre in the West End. He was due to appear in the Broadway transfer of the show at Bernard B. Jacobs Theatre in late 2018.  MacNeill had a small role as William Kemmler in The Current War in 2017.

References

External links
 

1988 births
21st-century people from Northern Ireland
Living people
Male film actors from Northern Ireland
Male stage actors from Northern Ireland
Male television actors from Northern Ireland
Male actors from Belfast